Prince Gwangjuwon was a royal prince of Goryeo. He was the only son of King Taejo of Goryeo and Lady Sogwangjuwon

Biography

Birth 
Prince Gwangjuwon was born as the son of King Taejo and Lady Sogwangjuwon. Gwangjuwon's uncle, Wang Gyu, was the head of an influential royal family. Gwangjuwon's birth name and birth date, are unknown.

Wang Gyu's rebellion 
In 945, Wang-Gyu sent assassins to kill King Hyejong while he was sleeping in his room so that Gwangjuwon could ascend to the throne. However, the king personally beat all of the assassins to death, foiling the plot. Not long after, Wang-gyu again sent assassins to kill Hyejong. However, Hyejong, after hearing a prophecy from astronomer Choe Ji-Mong, slept in another room, avoiding the assassination attempt.

However, even if Hyejong was killed, the throne would have gone to Taejo's older sons, Wang Yo (the future Jeongjong of Goryeo) and Wang-So (the future Gwangjong of Goryeo), instead of Gwangjuwon. Realizing this, Wang-gyu attempted to frame the two princes, to no avail.

Meanwhile, in September of the same year, Wang-Gyu was beheaded after being suppressed by the forces from Wang-Yo (왕요) and Wang Sik-ryeom (왕식렴).

Aftermath
A historian Kim Chang-Hyeon (김창현), on his book The Empire of Gwangjong (광종의 제국), estimated that the Prince was also executed by both of his half brothers, Jeongjong of Goryeo and Gwangjong of Goryeo who had tragically ruled the Prince's maternal grandfather, Wang-Gyu (왕규) at this time. This was because it was believed that not only Wang-Gyu but also the Prince could have acquired the legitimacy of the political affairs.

In popular culture
Portrayed by Byun Baek-hyun in the 2016 SBS TV Series Moon Lovers: Scarlet Heart Ryeo.

References

External links
Prince Gwangjuwon on Naver .

Korean princes
Year of birth unknown
945 deaths
10th-century Korean people